Bay of Kings is the seventh studio album from English guitarist Steve Hackett, released in October 1983 on Lamborghini Records. His first album consisting entirely of instrumental classical guitar music, Hackett's former record company Charisma Records refused to release it over concerns about its commercial viability. Hackett left the label and released Bay of Kings through independent record company Lamborghini Records, started by Patric Mimran who owned the said car company at that time. It was later reissued by Hackett's own label, Camino Records. His wife at the time, Kim Poor, originally painted a nude portrait for the cover, but it was replaced for the Camino reissue by a painting of her husband.

Track listing
"Bay of Kings" – 4:57
"The Journey" – 4:15
"Kim" – 2:25
"Marigold" – 3:37
"St. Elmo's Fire" – 3:08
"Petropolis" – 2:46
"Second Chance" – 1:59
"Cast Adrift" – 2:15
"Horizons" – 1:47
"Black Light" – 2:32
"The Barren Land" – 3:46
"Calmaria" – 3:23
"Time Lapse at Milton Keynes" – 3:57 (reissue bonus track)
"Tales of the Riverbank" (traditional) – 2:02 (reissue bonus track)
"Skye Boat Song" (traditional) – 1:37 (reissue bonus track)

Musicians
Steve Hackett – guitar, keyboards
Nick Magnus – synthesizer, keyboards
John Hackett – flute, keyboards

References

1983 albums
Steve Hackett albums